This page lists all described species of the spider family Hersiliidae accepted by the World Spider Catalog :

B

Bastanius

Bastanius Mirshamsi, Zamani & Marusik, 2016
 B. foordi (Marusik & Fet, 2009) — Iran
 B. kermanensis Mirshamsi, Zamani & Marusik, 2016 (type) — Iran

† Burmesiola

† Burmesiola Wunderlich, 2011
 † B. cretacea Wunderlich, 2011 
 † B. daviesi Wunderlich, 2015

D

Deltshevia

Deltshevia Marusik & Fet, 2009
 D. danovi Marusik & Fet, 2009 (type) — Turkmenistan, Kazakhstan
 D. gromovi Marusik & Fet, 2009 — Uzbekistan, Kazakhstan
 D. taftanensis Zamani & Marusik, 2021 — Iran

Duninia

Duninia Marusik & Fet, 2009
 D. baehrae Marusik & Fet, 2009 (type) — Turkmenistan, Iran
 D. darvishi Mirshamsi & Marusik, 2013 — Iran
 D. grodnitskyi Zamani & Marusik, 2018 — Iran
 D. rheimsae Marusik & Fet, 2009 — Iran

G

† Gerdia

† Gerdia Menge, 1869
 † G. myura Menge, 1869

† Gerdiopsis

† Gerdiopsis Wunderlich, 2004
 † G. infringens Wunderlich, 2004

† Gerdiorum

† Gerdiorum Wunderlich, 2004
 † G. inflexum Wunderlich, 2004

H

Hersilia

Hersilia Audouin, 1826
 H. albicomis Simon, 1887 — Ghana, Ivory Coast, Equatorial Guinea, Nigeria
 H. albinota Baehr & Baehr, 1993 — China
 H. albomaculata Wang & Yin, 1985 — China
 H. aldabrensis Foord & Dippenaar-Schoeman, 2006 — Seychelles (Aldabra), Comoros
 H. alluaudi Berland, 1920 — Congo, Tanzania
 H. arborea Lawrence, 1928 — Namibia, Zimbabwe, South Africa
 H. asiatica Song & Zheng, 1982 — China, Taiwan, Thailand, Laos
 H. australiensis Baehr & Baehr, 1987 — Australia (Northern Territory)
 H. baforti Benoit, 1967 — Congo, Uganda
 H. baliensis Baehr & Baehr, 1993 — Laos, Bali
 H. bifurcata Baehr & Baehr, 1998 — Australia (Northern Territory)
 H. bubi Foord & Dippenaar-Schoeman, 2006 — Equatorial Guinea, Uganda
 H. carobi Foord & Dippenaar-Schoeman, 2006 — Ivory Coast
 H. caudata Audouin, 1826 (type) — Cape Verde Is., West Africa to China
 H. clarki Benoit, 1967 — Zimbabwe
 H. clypealis Baehr & Baehr, 1993 — Thailand
 H. deelemanae Baehr & Baehr, 1993 — Indonesia (Sumatra)
 H. eloetsensis Foord & Dippenaar-Schoeman, 2006 — Madagascar
 H. facialis Baehr & Baehr, 1993 — Indonesia (Sumatra)
 H. feai Baehr & Baehr, 1993 — Myanmar
 H. flagellifera Baehr & Baehr, 1993 — Laos, Indonesia (Sumatra)
 H. furcata Foord & Dippenaar-Schoeman, 2006 — Congo
 H. hildebrandti Karsch, 1878 — Tanzania
 H. igiti Foord & Dippenaar-Schoeman, 2006 — Rwanda
 H. impressifrons Baehr & Baehr, 1993 — Borneo
 H. incompta Benoit, 1971 — Ivory Coast
 H. insulana Strand, 1907 — Madagascar
 H. jajat Rheims & Brescovit, 2004 — Borneo
 H. kerekot Rheims & Brescovit, 2004 — Borneo
 H. kinabaluensis Baehr & Baehr, 1993 — Borneo
 H. lelabah Rheims & Brescovit, 2004 — Borneo
 H. longbottomi Baehr & Baehr, 1998 — Australia (Western Australia)
 H. longivulva Sen, Saha & Raychaudhuri, 2010 — India
 H. madagascariensis (Wunderlich, 2004) — Madagascar, Comoros
 H. madang Baehr & Baehr, 1993 — New Guinea
 H. mainae Baehr & Baehr, 1995 — Australia (Western Australia)
 H. martensi Baehr & Baehr, 1993 — Nepal, Thailand
 H. mboszi Foord & Dippenaar-Schoeman, 2006 — Cameroon, Ivory Coast
 H. mimbi Baehr & Baehr, 1993 — Australia (Western Australia)
 H. mjoebergi Baehr & Baehr, 1993 — Indonesia (Sumatra)
 H. moheliensis Foord & Dippenaar-Schoeman, 2006 — Comoros
 H. montana Chen, 2007 — Taiwan
 H. mowomogbe Foord & Dippenaar-Schoeman, 2006 — Cameroon, Congo
 H. nentwigi Baehr & Baehr, 1993 — Indonesia (Java, Sumatra, Krakatau)
 H. nepalensis Baehr & Baehr, 1993 — Nepal
 H. novaeguineae Baehr & Baehr, 1993 — New Guinea
 H. occidentalis Simon, 1907 — West, Central, East Africa
 H. okinawaensis Tanikawa, 1999 — Japan
 H. orvakalensis Javed, Foord & Tampal, 2010 — India
 H. pectinata Thorell, 1895 — Myanmar, Indonesia (Borneo), Philippines
 H. pungwensis Tucker, 1920 — Zimbabwe
 H. sagitta Foord & Dippenaar-Schoeman, 2006 — Kenya, Tanzania, Malawi, South Africa
 H. savignyi Lucas, 1836 — Sri Lanka, India to Philippines
 H. scrupulosa Foord & Dippenaar-Schoeman, 2006 — Kenya, India
 H. selempoi Foord & Dippenaar-Schoeman, 2006 — Kenya
 H. sericea Pocock, 1898 — Kenya, Tanzania, Botswana, Zimbabwe, Mozambique, South Africa, Eswatini
 H. serrata Dankittipakul & Singtripop, 2011 — Thailand
 H. setifrons Lawrence, 1928 — Angola, Namibia, Zimbabwe, South Africa
 H. sigillata Benoit, 1967 — Gabon, Ivory Coast, Congo, Uganda
 H. simplicipalpis Baehr & Baehr, 1993 — Thailand
 H. striata Wang & Yin, 1985 — India, China, Myanmar, Thailand, Taiwan, Indonesia (Java, Sumatra)
 H. sumatrana (Thorell, 1890) — India, Malaysia, Indonesia (Sumatra, Borneo)
 H. sundaica Baehr & Baehr, 1993 — Thailand, Indonesia (Lombok, Sumbawa)
 H. taita Foord & Dippenaar-Schoeman, 2006 — Kenya
 H. taiwanensis Chen, 2007 — Taiwan
 H. talebii Mirshamsi, Zamani & Marusik, 2016 — Iran
 H. tamatavensis Foord & Dippenaar-Schoeman, 2006 — Madagascar
 H. tenuifurcata Baehr & Baehr, 1998 — Australia (Western Australia)
 H. thailandica Dankittipakul & Singtripop, 2011 — Thailand
 H. tibialis Baehr & Baehr, 1993 — India, Sri Lanka
 H. vanmoli Benoit, 1971 — Ivory Coast, Togo
 H. vicina Baehr & Baehr, 1993 — Thailand
 H. vinsoni Lucas, 1869 — Madagascar
 H. wellswebberae Baehr & Baehr, 1998 — Australia (Northern Territory)
 H. wraniki Rheims, Brescovit & van Harten, 2004 — Yemen (mainland, Socotra)
 H. xieae Yin, 2012 — China
 H. yaeyamaensis Tanikawa, 1999 — Japan
 H. yunnanensis Wang, Song & Qiu, 1993 — China
 † H. aquisextana Gourret, 1887 
 † H. longipes Giebel, 1856 
 † H. miranda Koch and Berendt, 1854

† Hersiliana

† Hersiliana Wunderlich, 2004
 † H. brevipes Wunderlich, 2004

Hersiliola

Hersiliola Thorell, 1870
 H. afghanica Roewer, 1960 — Afghanistan
 H. artemisiae Zamani, Mirshamsi & Marusik, 2017 — Iran
 H. bayrami Danişman, Sancak, Erdek & Coşar, 2012 — Turkey
 H. eltigani El-Hennawy, 2010 — Sudan
 H. esyunini Marusik & Fet, 2009 — Uzbekistan
 H. lindbergi Marusik & Fet, 2009 — Afghanistan
 H. macullulata (Dufour, 1831) (type) — Spain, Algeria, Mali, Israel, Yemen, Iran
 H. simoni (O. Pickard-Cambridge, 1872) — Spain, Northern Africa, Middle East, Iran
 H. sternbergsi Marusik & Fet, 2009 — Turkmenistan, Uzbekistan, Iran
 H. turcica Marusik, Kunt & Yağmur, 2010 — Turkey, Iran
 H. versicolor (Blackwall, 1865) — Cape Verde Is., Canary Is.?
 H. xinjiangensis (Liang & Wang, 1989) — China

I

Iviraiva

Iviraiva Rheims & Brescovit, 2004
 I. argentina (Mello-Leitão, 1942) — Brazil, Bolivia, Paraguay, Argentina
 I. pachyura (Mello-Leitão, 1935) (type) — Brazil, Paraguay, Argentina, Uruguay

M

Murricia

Murricia Simon, 1882
 M. cornuta Baehr & Baehr, 1993 — Singapore
 M. crinifera Baehr & Baehr, 1993 — Sri Lanka
 M. hyderabadensis Javed & Tampal, 2010 — India
 M. trapezodica Sen, Saha & Raychaudhuri, 2010 — India
 M. triangularis Baehr & Baehr, 1993 — India
 M. uva Foord, 2008 — Cameroon to Uganda

N

Neotama

Neotama Baehr & Baehr, 1993
 N. corticola (Lawrence, 1937) — South Africa
 N. cunhabebe Rheims & Brescovit, 2004 — Peru, Brazil
 N. forcipata (F. O. Pickard-Cambridge, 1902) — Mexico to El Salvador
 N. longimana Baehr & Baehr, 1993 — Indonesia (Java, Sumatra)
 N. mexicana (O. Pickard-Cambridge, 1893) — USA to Peru, Guyana
 N. obatala Rheims & Brescovit, 2004 — Peru, Brazil, Guyana
 N. punctigera Baehr & Baehr, 1993 — India
 N. rothorum Baehr & Baehr, 1993 — India
 N. variata (Pocock, 1899) (type) — Sri Lanka

O

Ovtsharenkoia

Ovtsharenkoia Marusik & Fet, 2009
 O. pallida (Kroneberg, 1875) (type) — Central Asia

P

Prima

Prima Foord, 2008
 P. ansieae Foord, 2008 (type) — Madagascar

Promurricia

Promurricia Baehr & Baehr, 1993
 P. depressa Baehr & Baehr, 1993 (type) — Sri Lanka

† Prototama

† Prototama Petrunkevitch, 1971
 † P. antiqua Petrunkevitch, 1971 
 † P. maior Wunderlich, 1988 
 † P. media Wunderlich, 1988 
 † P. minor Wunderlich, 1987 
 † P. succinea Petrunkevitch, 1971

S

† Spinasilia

† Spinasilia Wunderlich, 2015
 † S. dissoluta Wunderlich, 2015

T

Tama

Tama Simon, 1882
 T. edwardsi (Lucas, 1846) (type) — Spain, Portugal, Algeria

Tamopsis

Tamopsis Baehr & Baehr, 1987
 T. amplithorax Baehr & Baehr, 1987 — Australia (Western Australia)
 T. arnhemensis Baehr & Baehr, 1987 — Australia (Northern Territory, Queensland)
 T. brachycauda Baehr & Baehr, 1987 — Australia (Queensland, New South Wales)
 T. brevipes Baehr & Baehr, 1987 — Australia (New South Wales)
 T. brisbanensis Baehr & Baehr, 1987 — Australia (Queensland, New South Wales)
 T. centralis Baehr & Baehr, 1987 — Australia (Queensland)
 T. circumvidens Baehr & Baehr, 1987 — Australia (Western Australia, Victoria)
 T. cooloolensis Baehr & Baehr, 1987 — Australia (Queensland)
 T. darlingtoniana Baehr & Baehr, 1987 — Australia (Western Australia)
 T. daviesae Baehr & Baehr, 1987 — Australia (Queensland)
 T. depressa Baehr & Baehr, 1992 — Australia (Western Australia, Northern Territory)
 T. ediacarae Baehr & Baehr, 1988 — Australia (South Australia)
 T. eucalypti (Rainbow, 1900) (type) — Australia (Queensland to South Australia)
 T. facialis Baehr & Baehr, 1993 — Australia (Western Australia, South Australia, New South Wales)
 T. fickerti (L. Koch, 1876) — Australia (Queensland, New South Wales, Victoria)
 T. fitzroyensis Baehr & Baehr, 1987 — Australia (Western Australia, Queensland)
 T. floreni Rheims & Brescovit, 2004 — Borneo
 T. forrestae Baehr & Baehr, 1988 — Australia (Queensland)
 T. gibbosa Baehr & Baehr, 1993 — Australia (Western Australia, South Australia)
 T. gracilis Baehr & Baehr, 1993 — Australia (Western Australia)
 T. grayi Baehr & Baehr, 1987 — Australia (New South Wales)
 T. harveyi Baehr & Baehr, 1993 — Australia (Northern Territory)
 T. hirsti Baehr & Baehr, 1998 — Australia (South Australia)
 T. jongi Baehr & Baehr, 1995 — Australia (Western Australia)
 T. kimberleyana Baehr & Baehr, 1998 — Australia (Western Australia)
 T. kochi Baehr & Baehr, 1987 — Australia (Western Australia, New South Wales)
 T. leichhardtiana Baehr & Baehr, 1987 — Australia (Western Australia, Northern Territory, Queensland)
 T. longbottomi Baehr & Baehr, 1993 — Australia (Northern Territory)
 T. mainae Baehr & Baehr, 1993 — Australia (Western Australia)
 T. mallee Baehr & Baehr, 1989 — Australia (Western, South Australia, New South Wales)
 T. minor Baehr & Baehr, 1998 — Australia (Western Australia)
 T. nanutarrae Baehr & Baehr, 1989 — Australia (Western Australia)
 T. occidentalis Baehr & Baehr, 1987 — Australia (Western Australia)
 T. perthensis Baehr & Baehr, 1987 — Australia (Western Australia)
 T. petricola Baehr & Baehr, 1995 — Australia (Queensland)
 T. piankai Baehr & Baehr, 1993 — Australia (Western Australia)
 T. platycephala Baehr & Baehr, 1987 — Australia (Queensland)
 T. pseudocircumvidens Baehr & Baehr, 1987 — Australia (Western Australia, South Australia, Northern Territory)
 T. queenslandica Baehr & Baehr, 1987 — Australia (Queensland, New South Wales)
 T. raveni Baehr & Baehr, 1987 — Australia (Queensland, South Australia)
 T. reevesbyana Baehr & Baehr, 1987 — Australia (Western Australia, South Australia)
 T. riverinae Baehr & Baehr, 1993 — Australia (New South Wales)
 T. rossi Baehr & Baehr, 1987 — Australia (Western Australia)
 T. transiens Baehr & Baehr, 1992 — Australia (Western Australia, Northern Territory, Victoria)
 T. trionix Baehr & Baehr, 1987 — Australia (Queensland)
 T. tropica Baehr & Baehr, 1987 — Australia (Northern Territory, Queensland)
 T. tweedensis Baehr & Baehr, 1987 — Australia (Queensland, New South Wales)
 T. warialdae Baehr & Baehr, 1998 — Australia (New South Wales)
 T. wau Baehr & Baehr, 1993 — New Guinea
 T. weiri Baehr & Baehr, 1995 — Australia (Western Australia)

Tyrotama

Tyrotama Foord & Dippenaar-Schoeman, 2005
 T. abyssus Foord & Dippenaar-Schoeman, 2005 — South Africa, Lesotho
 T. arida (Smithers, 1945) (type) — South Africa
 T. australis (Simon, 1893) — Botswana, South Africa, Lesotho
 T. bicava (Smithers, 1945) — Angola, Namibia, South Africa
 T. fragilis (Lawrence, 1928) — Angola, Namibia
 T. incerta (Tucker, 1920) — Namibia, South Africa
 T. soutpansbergensis Foord & Dippenaar-Schoeman, 2005 — South Africa
 T. taris Foord & Dippenaar-Schoeman, 2005 — South Africa

Y

Yabisi

Yabisi Rheims & Brescovit, 2004
 Y. guaba Rheims & Brescovit, 2004 — Dominican Rep.
 Y. habanensis (Franganillo, 1936) (type) — USA, Cuba

Ypypuera

Ypypuera Rheims & Brescovit, 2004
 Y. crucifera (Vellard, 1924) (type) — Venezuela to Argentina
 Y. esquisita Rheims & Brescovit, 2004 — Ecuador
 Y. vittata (Simon, 1887) — Venezuela, Peru, Brazil, Suriname

References

Hersiliidae